The 2020 season is Balestier Khalsa's 25th consecutive season in the top flight of Singapore football and in the Singapore Premier League and the Singapore Cup.

Squad

Sleague Squad

U19

Project Vaults Oxley SC
(Deputy Chairman, Darwin Jalil is the President for the club)

Coaching staff

Transfer

Pre-season transfer

In 

Note 1: Noor Akid Nordin returns to the team after the loan and subsequently retires from football.

Out

Extension / Retained

Promoted

Mid-season transfer

In

Friendly

Pre-Season Friendly

Team statistics

Appearances and goals

Numbers in parentheses denote appearances as substitute.

Competitions

Overview

Singapore Premier League

Singapore Cup

See also 
 2017 Balestier Khalsa FC season
 2018 Balestier Khalsa FC season
 2019 Balestier Khalsa FC season

Notes

References 

Balestier Khalsa FC
Balestier Khalsa FC seasons